Bis(allyl)nickel is an organonickel compound with the formula Ni(η3-C3H5)2.  The molecule consists of two allyl ligands bound to nickel(II).  It has inversion symmetry.  It is a volatile yellow liquid.

Preparation and reactions
It can be prepared by the reaction of allyl magnesium bromide with anhydrous nickel chloride.  It was first prepared similarly by Gunther Wilke et al. The same group reported that the complex react with carbon monoxide to give nickel tetracarbonyl and 1,5-hexadiene.  It catalyzes the trimerization of butadiene.  With tertiary phosphines, the complex gives the tetrakis derivative. Such reactions to proceed via the intermediacy of the 18-electron adduct.

References

Organometallic chemistry
Transition metals
Allyl complexes
Coordination chemistry